The French Rugby Union Championship 1960-1961 was contested by 56 teams divided in 7 pools.

THE  Béziers  won the tournament beating the US Dax in the final.

Context 
The Five Nations Championship 1961 was won France

The Challenge Yves du Manoir was won by Mont-de-Marsan that beat the Béziers par 17 – 8.

Qualification round 

In bold the qualified to "last 32" phase

"Last 32" 

In bold the clubs qualified for the next round

"Last 16" 

In bold the clubs qualified for the next round

Quarter of finals 

In bold the clubs qualified for the next round

Semifinals

Final

External links
 Compte rendu finale de 1961 lnr.fr

France 1961
Champiomship